Ksenia Borisovna Tikhonenko (born 11 January 1993) is a Russian female professional basketball player for Nadezhda Orenburg and the Russian national team.

She participated at the EuroBasket Women 2017.

References

External links
Profile at eurobasket.com

1993 births
Living people
Sportspeople from Almaty
Russian women's basketball players
Power forwards (basketball)
Centers (basketball)
21st-century Russian women